Jakobsson is a surname of Icelandic  or Swedish origin. The name refers to:

Andreas Jakobsson (born 1972), Swedish professional football player
Åsa Jakobsson (born 1966), Swedish football player
Ejler Jakobsson (1911–1986), Finnish-American science-fiction author and editor
Evert Jakobsson (1886–1960), Finnish Olympic track and field athlete
Fritz Jakobsson (born 1940), Finnish painter
Gunnar Jakobsson, Finnish figure skater
Jarl Jakobsson (1880–1951), Finnish Olympic track and field athlete
Johan Jakobsson (born 1987), Swedish handball player
Kristian Jakobsson (born 1996), Swedish ice hockey player
Leif Jakobsson (born 1955), Swedish politician; member of the Riksdag since 2002
Louise Etzner Jakobsson (born 1960), Swedish para-equestrian
Ludowika Jakobsson (1884–1968), Finnish-German Olympic figure skater
Markus Jakobsson (born 1968), Swedish-American computer security researcher and entrepreneur
Menotti Jakobsson (1892–1970), Swedish skier
Naomi Jakobsson (born 1941), American politician from Illinois; state legislator since 2003
Nina Jakobsson (born 1990), Swedish footballer
Sofia Jakobsson (born 1990), Swedish footballer
Torsten Jakobsson (born 1957), Swedish skier
Walter Jakobsson (1882–1957), Finnish Olympic figure skater

See also 
Jacobsson

Swedish-language surnames
Patronymic surnames
Surnames from given names